The Frankfort Cemetery is a historic rural cemetery located on East Main Street in Frankfort, Kentucky. The cemetery is the  burial site of Daniel Boone and contains the graves of other famous Americans including seventeen Kentucky governors and a Vice President of the United States.

The cemetery is built on a bluff overlooking the Kentucky River with views of the Kentucky State Capitol, the Kentucky Governor's Mansion, downtown Frankfort, south Frankfort, and the Capitol District.

History
The cemetery was created by Judge Mason Brown, son of statesman John Brown, inspired by a visit to Mount Auburn Cemetery in Boston. Brown enlisted other Frankfort civic leaders and on February 27, 1844, the Kentucky General Assembly approved the cemetery's incorporation. The  property, then called Hunter's Garden, was purchased in 1845 for $3,801.

Brown hired Scottish-born landscape architect Robert Carmichael to design the cemetery. The cemetery is laid out in a style similar to Mount Auburn, with curving lanes, terraces and a circle of vaults. Carmichael imported and planted trees and flowering shrubs from the mountains of Kentucky, intending the cemetery to double as an arboretum in a time when residents could not easily travel to see mountain plants not native to the region. Carmichael is also buried in the cemetery.

There are numerous monuments and memoria in the cemetery. A central feature is the State Mound, featuring a Kentucky War Memorial designed by Robert E. Launitz and inscribed with the names of officers killed in numerous wars. During the American Civil War, Frankfort Cemetery was used for the final resting place of soldiers on both sides of the conflict. Corporal, Lyman B. Hannaford of the 103rd Ohio Infantry notes in his letter dated April 2, 1863, "They are planting (as soldiers term it) a good many soldiers here—almost one per day. That is a good many for the number of troops here."

Interments

Kentucky Governors

Seventeen Kentucky governors are buried there:

Other notable people
Other notable people buried at Frankfort Cemetery include:
 Rufus B. Atwood, president of Kentucky State University
 Bland Ballard, soldier and statesman
 William T. Barry, member of the United States Senate and United States Postmaster General
 George M. Bibb, U.S. Senate and United States Secretary of the Treasury
 Daniel Boone, American pioneer
 Rebecca Boone, American pioneer and the wife of Daniel Boone
 John Brown, lawyer, statesman
 Simon Bolivar Buckner, Jr., U.S. Army general, World War II
 Johnson N. Camden Jr., U.S. Senator
 Henry Clay, Jr., soldier and statesman
 Henry Crist, Kentucky pioneer, member of the Kentucky General Assembly and the United States House of Representatives
 George Bibb Crittenden, Confederate Army general
 Thomas Leonidas Crittenden, Union Army general
 Anthony Crockett, Revolutionary War soldier and politician
 John Milton Elliott, judge, murdered
 Thomas Y. Fitzpatrick, U.S. Representative, County Judge, County Attorney
 Gilbert Genesta, magician, drowned
 Martin D. Hardin, politician
 Parker Watkins Hardin, politician, Attorney General of Kentucky 1879–1888
 Joel Tanner Hart, sculptor
 Elizabeth Ann Hulette, professional wrestling manager
 Willard Rouse Jillson, Kentucky historian, geologist
 Richard Mentor Johnson, Vice President of the United States
 William Lindsay, U.S. Senate
 Humphrey Marshall, U.S. and Confederate States Congressman, Confederate Army general
 Thomas Francis Marshall, lawyer, politician, Kentucky House of Representatives
 John Calvin Mason, attorney, U.S. Representative
 Silas B. Mason, construction contractor who built the Grand Coulee Dam, racehorse owner/breeder who won the 1933 Preakness Stakes
 Samuel McKee, law, U.S. Representative
 Presley O'Bannon, U.S. Marine credited as first to raise the American flag over foreign soil in 1805 at the Battle of Derna.
 Theodore O'Hara, poet, newspaperman, soldier
 Lucy Phenton Pattie, 1842–1922, the only honorary initiated female member of Sigma Alpha Epsilon fraternity
 Thomas H. Paynter, U.S. Senate
 Paul Sawyier, Kentucky artist
 Solomon P. Sharp, Attorney General of Kentucky murdered in the Beauchamp–Sharp Tragedy
 John Simpson, soldier, member of the Kentucky General Assembly, Speaker of the Kentucky House of Representatives, and Congressman-elect
 Daniel Weisiger Swigert, 1883–1912, Thoroughbred racehorse breeder, owner of Elmendorf Farm
 Isham Talbot, U.S. Senate
 Landon Addison Thomas, businessman and member of the Kentucky General Assembly from Frankfort, Kentucky
 Thomas Todd, Associate Justice of the United States Supreme Court
 South Trimble, Kentucky House of Representatives, U.S. Representative, Clerk of the United States House of Representatives
 Emily Harvie Thomas Tubman, businesswoman and philanthropist from Frankfort, Kentucky, was an early supporter of the Christian Church (Disciples of Christ)
 John White, served in the Kentucky House of Representatives and in the U.S. House, where he served as Speaker of the House

Gallery

References

External links

 
 Frankfort Cemetery Map & Photos
 
 Daniel Boone's Grave

Cemeteries on the National Register of Historic Places in Kentucky
National Register of Historic Places in Frankfort, Kentucky
Protected areas of Franklin County, Kentucky
Rural cemeteries